The Tahltan Bear Dog was a breed of dog that came to Canada in early migrations and acclimatised to the environment.

Appearance
The Tahltan was built somewhere between the lines of the spitz and pariah types. The ideal dog was, above all else, athletic and agile so as to distract and harass big game.

As they were always bred solely for hunting value, appearance could vary significantly between dogs.

Coat and colour

A Tahltan Bear Dog was primarily black, dark brown or blue, with some white patches on the chest, underbelly and sometimes the feet or tail. Standing 14 to 17 inches high at the shoulder, with relatively large, erect pointed ears, with a refined, pointed muzzle. The glossy coat was of average length, with guard hairs covering a thicker undercoat. Paws some what webbed and relatively large for the size of the dog.

Like others of their group, they had a peculiar yodel. Foxy in appearance, their main distinction among dogs is their novel tail. Short, bushy and carried erect, it has been described variously as a shaving brush or a whisk broom.

History
Raised by the Tahltan people to hunt bears, the Tahltan Bear Dog was small of size but capable of hunting much larger animals. The morning of the hunt, two dogs were carried in a sack over the hunter's shoulder until fresh bear tracks were sighted. Upon release, the dogs moved lightly over the crust of snow while the bear was slowed by the deep drifts. Their fox-like staccato yaps harassed the bear into submission or confused it until the hunter could come close enough for a kill.

The Tahltan Bear Dog was friendly and gentle with smaller animals and with humans. They lived in the tent with the family, sharing bed and board.

Descended from pariah-type dogs that had come with prehistoric migrations, the Tahltan Dogs were centralized in the remote mountainous areas of northwestern British Columbia and the Southern Yukon. Their usual diet was small bits of birds, meat and fish, and they flourished in the bitter cold. Outside their native environment, they succumbed to distemper, heat prostration and problems due to dietary changes. As European explorers came into the territory, bringing guns as trade, the Tahltan Bear Dog faded from history.

Genetic references in the archeological record show no modern relationship of Tahltan dogs to any modern populations.

References

External links

Tahltan Bear Dog image
The Complete 'Tail' of the Tahltan Bear Dog

Extinct dog breeds of Canada
First Nations culture
Dog breeds originating from Indigenous Americans